The 2016–17 Colorado Buffaloes men's basketball team represented the University of Colorado in the 2016–17 NCAA Division I men's basketball season. They were led by head coach Tad Boyle in his seventh season at Colorado. The Buffaloes played their home games at Coors Events Center in Boulder, Colorado as members of the Pac-12 Conference. They finished the season 19–15, 8–10 in Pac-12 play to finish in seventh place. They defeated Washington State in the first round of the Pac-12 tournament to advance to the quarterfinals where they lost to Arizona. They were invited to the National Invitation Tournament where the lost in the first round to UCF.

Previous season
The Buffaloes finished the 2015–16 season 22–12, 10–8 in Pac-12 play to finish in fifth place. They defeated Washington State in the first round of the Pac-12 tournament before losing to Arizona in the quarterfinals. They received an at-large bid to the NCAA tournament as a No. 8 seed in the South region where they lost to No. 9-seed Connecticut in the first round.

Off-season

Departures

2016 recruiting class

2017 Recruiting class

Roster

Schedule and results

|-
!colspan=12 style=| Non-conference regular season

|-
!colspan=12 style=| Pac-12 regular season

|-
!colspan=12 style=| Pac-12 tournament

|-
!colspan=12 style=| NIT

References

Colorado
Colorado Buffaloes men's basketball seasons
Colorado
Colorado Buffaloes
Colorado Buffaloes